Silk is a British television drama series produced by the BBC which was broadcast over three series on BBC One between 22 February 2011 and 31 March 2014. Created by Peter Moffat, the series follows the daily goings on of Shoe Lane Chambers and its members in their personal and professional lives.

Origin
The series' writer, Peter Moffat, also wrote the series Criminal Justice and North Square, as well as an episode of Kavanagh QC. Before the series started, Moffat said in an interview, "I wanted Silk to be full of politics and intrigue. From my experience at the Bar, I felt life in chambers had all of those components, with big stories and lots of courtroom drama—but I wanted to make it as much about barristers and their life in chambers as about the trials".

Silk was commissioned by Jay Hunt, then-Controller of BBC One and Ben Stephenson, BBC Controller of Drama Commissioning, and started filming in July 2010. It is based on Moffat's experiences at the Bar. In an interview with The Guardian, he said "I want to tell it as it really is. The extreme pressure, the hard choices, the ethical dilemmas, the overlap between the personal and the professional, principles fought for and principles sacrificed, the Machiavellian politics, the sex, the drinking, the whole story—life at the bar is the richest possible drama territory."

The series' title is a colloquial reference to someone who has attained the status of King's Counsel (QC or KC dependent on the current reigning monarch,) which entitles the person to wear a certain design of gown in court, which is usually made of silk.

Overview
Silk follows barristers from a set of criminal law chambers in London. The series' focuses on Martha Costello (Maxine Peake) and her ambition to become Queen's Counsel as well as on her rival, Clive Reader (Rupert Penry-Jones). Martha achieves her ambition at the end of Series One, leaving Clive disappointed. He however becomes a QC in the opening episode of Series 3. The chambers' senior clerk, Billy Lamb (Neil Stuke), also features heavily in the series. In series 3, Miranda Raison joins the show as Harriet Hammond who is a thorn in the side of Billy, as well as a confidante, supporter, and potential love interest for Clive Reader.

Silk ended with series 3 because creator Moffat and lead actress, Maxine Peake, were keen to end at a high point. 
Rupert Penry-Jones commented that: 

In March 2014, it was announced there will be a radio spin-off following the lives of the clerks of Shoe Lane Chambers.

In October 2014, it was announced that the series would be adapted by ABC for USA television. Peter Moffat was due to executive produce, with the pilot being written by Marty Scott.

Cast

 Maxine Peake as Martha Costello QC, Barrister
 Rupert Penry-Jones as Clive Reader QC, Barrister
 Neil Stuke as Billy Lamb, Senior Clerk
 John MacMillan as John Bright, Clerk
 Theo Barklem-Biggs as Jake Milner, Junior Clerk
 Alex Jennings as Alan Cowdrey QC, Head of Chambers
 Tom Hughes as Nick Slade, a pupil who shadows Martha Costello (Series 1)
 Natalie Dormer as Niamh Cranitch, a pupil who shadows Clive Reader (Series 1)
 Nina Sosanya as Kate Brockman, Barrister (Series 1)
 Jamie Di Spirito as Jimmy Johnson, Junior Clerk (Series 1)
 Frances Barber as Caroline Warwick QC, Barrister (Series 2—3)
 Phil Davis as Mickey Joy, Solicitor (Series 2—3)
 Indira Varma as George Duggan, CPS Solicitor (Series 2)
 Amy Wren as Bethany Brassington, Junior Clerk (Series 2—3)
 Shaun Evans as Daniel Lomas, a pupil who shadows Martha Costello (Series 2)
 Miranda Raison as Harriet Hammond, Practice Manager (Series 3)
 Jessica Henwick as Amy Lang, a pupil who shadows Martha Costello, Clive Reader & Caroline Warwick (Series 3)

Episode list

Series 1 (2011)

Series 2 (2012)

Series 3 (2014)

Home media

In other media

Radio
BBC Radio 4 featured a spin-off "Silk: The Clerks Room" that lasted for two seasons from 2014 to 2015, featuring Theo Barklem-Biggs as Jake, Neil Stuke as Billy, and Jessica Henwick as Amy.

Critical reception
Writing in The Daily Telegraph, barrister Sarah Palin praised Silk, saying that "the opening episodes do a good job of capturing the relentless pressure of the criminal Bar" and that "the competition for silk, while a useful plot device, also accurately reflects the fiercely competitive nature of the Bar", but added "the characters featured are a little more youthful than their real-life counterparts" and that the storyline in which one of the pupil barristers shoplifts his wig and gown struck "an absurd note". The Telegraph television reviewer, James Walton, compared the series to Moffat's previous production, North Square, but said that Silk was "more viewer-friendly" and the characters "far easier to divide into heroes and villains". He concluded that the first episode was "a perfectly OK hour of telly—marred only by the fact that we've come to expect a bit more than that from Moffat." Alex Aldridge of The Guardian, meanwhile, called the series "underwhelming" and stated that it implied that cocaine use was "rife" among criminal barristers. Also writing in The Guardian, Lucy Mangan implied that the series was predictable and called it "a rare misfire by Peter Moffat [...] and aggravated by the squandering of Peake, whose usually overflowing talents seem to have been dammed here rather than encouraged to irrigate an oddly bloodless role."

The first series averaged 5.85 million viewers. The second series averaged 5.74 million viewers. The third series averaged 5.37 million viewers.

References

External links

2010s British drama television series
2010s British legal television series
2011 British television series debuts
2014 British television series endings
BBC high definition shows
BBC television dramas
2010s British crime television series
Television shows shot in London
English-language television shows